Sebastián Gutiérrez Atehortua (born 29 September 1997) is a Colombian professional footballer.

Club career

Patriotas
On 2 September 2016, Gutiérrez made his senior debut for Categoría Primera A side Patriotas in the Copa Colombia, which would be his only appearance of the season. The following season, he made six league appearances for Patriotas and two appearances in the Copa Colombia.

Llaneros
In 2018, Gutiérrez joined Categoría Primera B side Llaneros, making eight league appearances and six in the league finals, where he scored two goals in a 5–0 win over Cortuluá. The following season, he scored eight goals in 27 appearances in league play, and made another six appearances in the Torneo I finals.

York United
On 15 December 2020, Gutiérrez signed with Canadian Premier League side York United. Following a visa issue preventing him from entering the country, he finally joined the team in August 2021. On 21 August he made his debut for York against Master's FA in a Canadian Championship match. In December 2021 York United announced they had triggered the contract option on Gutiérrez, keeping him at the club through 2022. After the 2022 season, York declined his contract option.

Career statistics

References

External links

1997 births
Living people
Association football midfielders
Colombian footballers
Colombian expatriate footballers
Expatriate soccer players in Canada
Colombian expatriate sportspeople in Canada
Patriotas Boyacá footballers
Llaneros F.C. players
York United FC players
Categoría Primera A players
Categoría Primera B players
Canadian Premier League players